The Heimifeng Pumped Storage Power Station is located at the hills of Heimifeng, Qiaoyi town, Wangcheng district,  north of Changsha in Hunan province, China. It was constructed between 2005 and 2009 with the generators being commissioned in 2009 and 2010. The station generates power by transferring water between an upper and lower reservoir. When energy demand is high, water from the upper reservoir is released and used to generate electricity before being discharged into the lower reservoir. During times of low demand, water from the lower reservoir is then pumped back up to replenish upper reservoir. This process allows the station to meet peak energy demand and it can go from standstill to operational in three minutes.

The upper reservoir is located at an elevation of  formed by two main dams and two auxiliary dams. Located in the underground power station is four  reversible Francis pump turbines. The station generates 1.606 billion kWh annually and consumes 2.16 billion kWh in pumping mode. The plant is profitable because pumping occurs during low demand periods when electricity is cheap.

See also

List of pumped-storage hydroelectric power stations

References

Dams completed in 2009
Energy infrastructure completed in 2010
Dams in China
Concrete-face rock-fill dams
Hydroelectric power stations in Hunan
Pumped-storage hydroelectric power stations in China
Underground power stations
2010 establishments in China